The 2005 Skate Canada International was the second event of six in the 2005–06 ISU Grand Prix of Figure Skating, a senior-level international invitational competition series. It was held at the Mile One Stadium in St. John's, Newfoundland and Labrador, on October 27–30. Medals were awarded in the disciplines of men's singles, ladies' singles, pair skating, and ice dancing. Skaters earned points toward qualifying for the 2005–06 Grand Prix Final. The compulsory dance was the Yankee Polka.

Results

Men
Jeffrey Buttle's pants split during his free skating; it posed no danger so he continued skating with no pause.

Ladies
Cynthia Phaneuf was originally scheduled to compete but withdrew due to a minor stress fracture in an ankle.

Pairs

Ice dancing

References

External links
 2005 Skate Canada International

Skate Canada International, 2005
Skate Canada International
2005 in Canadian sports
2005 in Newfoundland and Labrador